El otro "yo" del profesor Bacterio (English: Professor Bacterio's Other "Me") is a 1972-1973 comic written and drawn by Francisco Ibañez for the Mortadelo y Filemón (Mort & Phil) comic series.

Publication history 
The comic strip was first published in the Mortadelo magazine, issues #101 (October 30, 1972) to #111 (January 8, 1973).

Plot 
Professor Bacterio has developed an elixir meant to stimulate a person's subconscious alter ego, and decided to test it on himself first. The elixir works, but Bacterio's hidden persona turns out to be a vicious prankster who commits a lot of mischief all over town and then proudly calls El Super to inform him of his achievements. His plots include:
Playing dead and thus luring innocent pedestrians into the range of his billy club
Sabotaging all traffic signs in and around town
Turning cars into traps-on-wheels for their drivers
Releasing selected animals from their cages in the local zoo
Vilifying the city's best hotel in the eyes of its patrons
Pulling pranks (the injuring kind) with the patients of the city hospital
Sabotaging circus paraphernalia
Turning a classic ballet performance into a nerve-wracking disaster for the manager
Switching a restaurant's food supply with dangerous substances (like nitroglycerin in place of cognac)
Refitting a fitness studio's equipment into accident-causing implements

Eventually, Bacterio works his final ploy by sneaking back into the T.I.A. headquarters in disguise and playing his jokes on Mortadelo, Filemon, and El Super themselves, but in the course of that action he gets knocked on the head and comes back to his senses. Relieved that their ordeal is over, Mortadelo and Filemon take a sip of cognac to ease their nerves, but the bottle they drink from actually contains the rest of Bacterio's elixir. As a result, they turn into villainous pranksters as well, and El Super and Bacterio end up as their first victims, rolling to the edge of a ravine inside a thoroughly sealed and disabled car.

In other media 
This comic's plot was adapted into an episode of the same name for the Mortadelo y Filemón cartoon series.

Bibliography
 DE LA CRUZ PÉREZ, Francisco Javier. Los cómics de Francisco Ibáñez. Ediciones de la Universidad de Castilla–La Mancha Cuenca, 2008. 
 FERNÁNDEZ SOTO, Miguel. El mundo de Mortadelo y Filemón. Medialive Content, 2008. 
 GUIRAL, Antoni. El gran libro de Mortadelo y Filemón: 50 aniversario. Ediciones B.

References 

Mort & Phil comic books
1972 in comics